Ali Beyg Kandi (also Romanized as ‘Alī Beyg Kandī; also known as Alba Kand, Alba Kandi, Al’ ba-Kendy, ‘Alī Bekandī, and ‘Alī Beyk Kandī) is a village in Ozomdel-e Jonubi Rural District, in the Central District of Varzaqan County, East Azerbaijan Province, Iran. At the 2006 census, its population was 130, in 27 families.

References 

Towns and villages in Varzaqan County